Sholto Taylor (born 1 September 1972) is a New Zealand wheelchair rugby player, and a member of the national team, the Wheel Blacks.

He has competed with the Wheel Blacks at several international events, including the 1996 Summer Paralympics, the 2000 Summer Paralympics (winning bronze), the 2004 Summer Paralympics (gold), and the 2006 World Championships (silver). Taylor was the flagbearer of New Zealand's delegation at the Opening Ceremony of the 2008 Paralympics. His team finished in fifth place at those games.

References

External links 
 
 

1972 births
Living people
New Zealand wheelchair rugby players
Paralympic wheelchair rugby players of New Zealand
Paralympic gold medalists for New Zealand
Paralympic bronze medalists for New Zealand
Paralympic medalists in wheelchair rugby
Wheelchair rugby players at the 1996 Summer Paralympics
Wheelchair rugby players at the 2000 Summer Paralympics
Wheelchair rugby players at the 2004 Summer Paralympics
Wheelchair rugby players at the 2008 Summer Paralympics
Medalists at the 1996 Summer Paralympics
Medalists at the 2000 Summer Paralympics
Medalists at the 2004 Summer Paralympics
Ngāti Kahungunu people